Arrothia bicolor is a moth of the family Noctuidae. This moth is native to western Madagascar.

The female of this species has a wingspan of 20 mm, the basal half of the forewings is buffish yellow shaded with black scales and the other half is black. The hindwings are similar but the yellow half is less shattered with black scales. Antennae, palpi, head are black.

References

Agaristinae
Moths described in 1896
Moths of Madagascar
Moths of Africa